Cabanis's greenbul (Phyllastrephus cabanisi), also known as Cabanis's bulbul, is a species of songbird in the bulbul family, Pycnonotidae. It is found in east-central and south-central Africa. Its natural habitats are subtropical or tropical dry forest, subtropical or tropical moist lowland forest, subtropical or tropical moist montane forest, and subtropical or tropical moist shrubland.

Taxonomy and systematics
Cabanis's greenbul was originally described in the genus Criniger. The common name and Latin binomial commemorates the German ornithologist Jean Louis Cabanis. Formerly, some authorities considered the placid greenbul to be a subspecies of Cabanis's greenbul, or Cabanis's greenbul to be a subspecies of Fischer's greenbul.

Subspecies
Two subspecies are recognized:
 P. c. cabanisi - (Sharpe, 1881): Found from central Angola to south-eastern Democratic Republic of the Congo, western Tanzania and northern Zambia
 Olive greenbul (P. c. sucosus) - Reichenow, 1903: Found from southern Sudan and western Kenya to eastern Democratic Republic of the Congo and north-western Tanzania

References

Cabanis's greenbul
Birds of East Africa
Birds of Central Africa
Cabanis's greenbul
Taxonomy articles created by Polbot